Silas Kpanan'Ayoung Siakor is a Liberian environmentalist. He was awarded the Goldman Environmental Prize in 2006, for his revealing of illegal logging in Liberia and its connection to the civil war, leading to export sanctions from the United Nations Security Council.

Silas Siakor was featured in the 2017 film Silas, directed by Anjali Nayar and Hawa Essuman.

References 

Year of birth missing (living people)
Living people
Liberian environmentalists
Goldman Environmental Prize awardees